The 2007 European Short Course Swimming Championships, which was the 15th edition of the continental swimming event, were held between 13–16 December 2007 in Debrecen, Hungary. The championships were swum in the Debrecen Swimming Pool Complex, in a short course (25-metre) pool.

Participating nations
A total of 39 nations registered for the championship:

 
 
 
 
 
 
 
 
 
 
 
 
 
 
 
 
 
 
 
 
 
 
 
 
  Macedonia

Events
The events were held over four days, divided into a morning session, when the preliminary heats were staged, and an evening session, when the semifinals and finals took place.

Medal table

Medal summary

Men's events

Women's events

References

External links 
 Official site
 Swim Rankings Results
 Results book

Short Course, European Championships
2007 in Hungarian sport
2007
International aquatics competitions hosted by Hungary
Sport in Debrecen
December 2007 sports events in Europe